Makki may refer to:

Makki (Arabic: مكي, 'Meccan'), something or someone coming from Mecca

People

Makki
Mäkki, Estonian-born Finnish rapper and DJ
Abdul Rehman Makki (born c. 1948), Islamist activist and leading figure of Jamat ud Dawah
Diala Makki (born 1981), Lebanese-Iranian media personality
Fadi Makki, Lebanese behavioural scientist

Almuayad Makki, Canadian. Cloud Engineering Scientist.

Hassan Muhammad Makki (1933–2016), politician and Prime Minister of Yemen Arab Republic in 1974
Hossein Makki (1911–1999), Iranian politician, orator and historian
Imdadullah Muhajir Makki (1814–1896), South Asian Muslim Sufi scholar
Irfan Makki (born 1975), Pakistani Canadian singer-songwriter
Najat Makki (born 1956, Emirati artist

Al-Makki
Abu Talib al-Makki (Muhammad ibn Ali, died 996), scholar, jurist and Sufi mystic
Ibn Kathir al-Makki (45-120AH), one of the transmitters of the seven canonical Qira'at
Muhammad Al-Makki (1145–1246), saint of the people of Sindh, warrior, ruler over Yemen and explorer

See also

Maki (disambiguation)
Makki surah, or Meccan surah, chronologically early chapters of the Quran
Makki di roti, a flat unleavened Punjabi bread